The following is a list of notable Eritreans.

Athletes

 Shannon-Ogbnai Abeda
 Abel Aferworki
 Nat Berhe
 Joel Gerezgiher
 Henok Goitom
 Nebiat Habtemariam
 Mebrahtom (Meb) Keflezighi
 Thomas Kelati
 Yonas Kifle
 Mekseb Debesay
 Oliver Kylington
 Golgol Mebrahtu
 Teklemariam Medhin
 Simret Sultan
 Zersenay Tadese
 Daniel Teklehaymanot
 Merhawi Kudus
 Natnael Berhane
 Ghirmay Ghebreslassie
 Mossana Debesai
 Zemenfes Solomon
 Hennos Asmelash

Artists
 Michael Adonai
 Yegizaw Michael
 Hamid Barole Abdu
 Saba Kidane
 Abdulkadir Kebire
 Fesshaye Yohannes
 Osman Saleh Sabbe
 Dawit Isaak
 Ruth Simon
 Genet Sium
 Hannah Pool

Singers and musicians
 Adiam
 Abraham Afewerki
 Afrob
 Negash Ali
 Yemane Baria
 Eriam Sisters
 Dehab Faytinga
 Abeba Haile
 Senait Ghebrehiwet Mehari
 Helen Meles
 Bereket Mengisteab
 U-n-i (Yonas)
 Winta
 Tsehaytu Beraki
 Abeba Haile
 Deno
 Abrar Osman
 Nipsey Hussle

Actors/Actresses
 Zeudi Araya
 Ella Thomas
 Tiffany Haddish
 Mereb Estifanos

Political figures
 Haregot Abbai
 Isaias Afwerki
 General Oqbe Abreha
 Ogbe Abraha
 Ali Abdu Ahmed
 Ibrahim Sultan Ali
 Aman Mikael Andom
 Hamid Idris Awate
 Tedla Bairu
 Osman Saleh Mohammed
 Zerai Deres
 Araya Desta
 Ali Said Abdella
 Sebhat Ephrem
 Yemane Gebreab
 Haile Samuel
 Ghirmai Gebremariam
 Umar Hassan
 Abdalla Jabir
 Abraha Kassa
 Abdulkadir Kebire
 Tekle Kiflay
 Mohamed Omer
 Osman Saleh Sabbe
 Mahmood Sherifo
 Petros Solomon
 Semere Russom 
 Paulos Tesfagiorgis
 Woldeab Woldemariam
 Haile Woldense
 Haile Menkerios
 Saleh Meki
 Kaleb Tedla
 Filipos Woldeyohannes
 Mahmoud Ahmed Sherifo
 Mesfin Hagos
 Hamid Himid
 Saleh Idris Kekya
 Estifanos Seyoum
 Astier Fesehazion
 Germano Nati
 Beraki Gebreselassie

Scholars and educators
 Semhar Araia
 Haben Girma
 Bereket Habte Selassie

Journalists
 Yirgalem Fisseha Mebrahtu
 Dawit Isaak
 Hannah Pool
 Fesshaye Yohannes
 David Fjäll

Doctors/Professors
 Haile Debas
 Paulos Tesfagiorgis

Noble men
 Abram Petrovich Gannibal
 Bahta Hagos
 Bahr negus Yeshaq
 Woldemichael Solomon

 
Eritrea
 
Eritrea